Malcolm Douglas Farr (March 24, 1884 – April 28, 1956) was an American businessman and politician.

Farr was born in Kenosha, Wisconsin. He went to the Kenosha public schools and to the Northwestern Military Academy. He was the president of the Independent Ice Company and the Sunshine Coal Company. Farr served in the Wisconsin Assembly in 1921 and 1922 as a Republican. He then moved to Phoenix, Arizona and was the chief executive of a pipe manufacturing company. In 1946, Farr moved to Costa Mesa, California where he died.

Notes

1884 births
1956 deaths
Politicians from Kenosha, Wisconsin
People from Costa Mesa, California
Businesspeople from Phoenix, Arizona
Businesspeople from Wisconsin
20th-century American politicians
20th-century American businesspeople
Republican Party members of the Wisconsin State Assembly